The following is a glossary of terms used in the card game blackjack. This is not intended to be a formal dictionary; precise usage details and multiple closely related senses are omitted here in favor of concise treatment of the basics.

8 

Being told by a casino that you are being removed, generally due to suspected advantage play.

B 

Any counting system which has an exact balance between plus cards and minus cards. In such a system, if the deck were counted down to the bottom, the sum would be zero.

 Having a total over 21.

The individual card that brings the hand's total over 21.

A collection of actions that will offer the best odds off the top of the deck. These actions vary when different rules are applied to the game.

C 

Acronym for continuous shuffling machine.

D 

 After seeing their hand, a player can double by placing an additional bet equal to their original bet and drawing one and only one additional card. This move may only be used on the first two cards.

E 

 When the dealer shows an ace and the player has a blackjack, the player can opt for even money and get paid immediately at 1:1. This is a version of insurance rather than a different bet. If the dealer has blackjack, the hand is a push, but the player receives twice the value of the insurance, which is the same as the original bet. If the dealer does not have blackjack, the player wins 1.5 times the value of the original bet but loses the value of the insurance and still ends up with the value of the original bet.

F 

 The betting spot located to the dealer's left, which is first to receive cards.

 A bonus or automatic win in some games when a hand contains five cards without busting.

H 

 A hand without an ace or a hand where the ace must count as 1 to avoid busting.

 To ask for another card. If that extra card makes the total over 21, then the player busts.

 A dealer card that is dealt face down and not revealed to players until after they have acted upon their hands.

I 

 When the dealer shows an ace, the player can choose to place a side bet of up to half the value of the original bet. If the dealer has blackjack, the bet pays 2:1. If the dealer does not have blackjack, the player loses the wager.

N 

A two card total of 21. A blackjack.

P 

 A number or fraction that represents how many cards/decks will be dealt before shuffling in contrast to the total number of cards/decks in play.  It may be expressed in percentage form or as a fraction where the denominator is always the total number of decks in play such as  "4.5/6" or "75% penetration".

 A blackjack game dealt from the hand of the dealer, normally using 1 or 2 decks

 A tie; the player and dealer have hands with the same total below 22.

S 

 A device used to hold multiple decks of cards, typically 4, 6 or 8. Cards are dealt one at a time from the shoe.

 A blackjack game dealt from a shoe. Shoe games typically use more than 2 decks.

 A soft hand is a hand that includes an ace valued as 11, as opposed to 1.

 If a player is dealt two cards of the same rank, they can choose to play each of them separately, putting up a bet for each one.

 To stop asking for more cards.

 Any hard hand where the possibility to exceed 21 exists by drawing an additional card namely 12, 13, 14, 15 or 16

 To surrender is to abandon your hand, while recovering half of your initial bet. This is only available as your first and only action.

T 

 The betting spot located on the dealer's right which is last to act.

U 

 The card that the dealer is showing.

References

Blackjack
Blackjack
Wikipedia glossaries using description lists